Chief of Staff to the Prime Minister is appointed by the Prime Minister of Latvia.

List

References 

Politics of Latvia